Mursell is an English surname. Notable people with this surname include the following:

 Rt Revd Gordon Mursell (born 1949), former bishop of Stafford in England
 James Mursell (1893–1963), American musicologist
 James C. Mursell (1860–1948), British philatelist
 Tom Mursell, English media spokesperson and youth entrepreneur

See also
 George Garrett (composer) (full name George Mursell Garrett) (1834–1897), English organist and composer
 Revd James Phillippo (full name James Mursell Phillippo) (1798–1879), English Baptist missionary and abolitionist active in Jamaica 

English-language surnames